Frank Ellsworth Doremus  (August 31, 1865 – September 4, 1947) was a politician from the U.S. state of Michigan.

Early life
Doremus was born in Venango County, Pennsylvania, on August 31, 1865, the son of Sylvester and Sarah Peake Doremus.  The Doremus family moved to Ovid, Michigan, in 1866, and then to Portland, Michigan, in 1872.   Frank Doremus attended the public schools of Portland and graduated from Detroit College of Law.

In 1882, Doremus began work at the Portland Observer, then moved on to take charge of the Pewamo Plain Dealer and established the Portland Review in 1885, editing it until 1899.

Doremus married Libby Hatley in 1890. The couple had one child, Robert.

Politics
Doremus was postmaster of Portland from 1895 to 1899.  He was elected township clerk in 1888 and re-elected in 1889. In 1890, Doremus was elected to the Michigan House of Representatives from Ionia County's 1st District serving from 1890 to 1892.

He was admitted to the bar and commenced practice in Detroit in 1899.  He was assistant corporation counsel of Detroit from 1903 to 1907 and city comptroller 1907-1910.

In 1910, Doremus defeated incumbent Republican Edwin C. Denby to be elected as a Democrat from Michigan's 1st congressional district to the Sixty-second and to the four succeeding Congresses, serving from March 4, 1911, to March 3, 1921, and was elected chair of the Democratic Congressional Campaign Committee in 1913.  He was a delegate to Democratic National Convention from Michigan in 1916 and 1920.  He served as mayor of Detroit in 1923, defeating former Detroit Police Commissioner Dr. James W. Inches in the general election, until he resigned the following year due to ill-health.

He resumed the practice of law in Fowlerville, Michigan.  Frank Ellsworth Doremus died in Howell, Michigan, and was interred in Roseland Park, Berkley, Michigan.

References

External links

The Political Graveyard
	

1865 births
1947 deaths
People from Venango County, Pennsylvania
American people of Dutch descent
Democratic Party members of the United States House of Representatives from Michigan
Democratic Party members of the Michigan House of Representatives
Mayors of Detroit
People from Ovid, Michigan
People from Portland, Michigan
People from Livingston County, Michigan
Detroit College of Law alumni
19th-century American politicians
20th-century American politicians